Coconut shrimp is a shrimp dish prepared using shrimp and coconut as primary ingredients. It can be prepared as a crunchy dish with the shrimp coated and deep fried, pan-fried or baked, and as a sautéed dish using coconut milk and other ingredients. It can be prepared and served on skewers.

Crunchy
Crunchy coconut shrimp is typically prepared using shrimp that are coated with flour, placed in an egg wash, coated with a flaked coconut and bread crumb mix, and then deep fried. The shrimp can be butterflied prior to being coated. Panko bread crumbs or standard bread crumbs can be used, as can a mixture of both. Chopped nuts such as macadamia and almond can be used as additional ingredients to coat the shrimp.

This version of the dish can also be baked, pan-fried, or grilled, rather than deep-fried. Baked versions may have fewer calories and fat compared to deep-fried versions. After cooking, the shrimp have a crunchy texture. It may be served with various dipping sauces, such as sweet and sour sauce, peach sauce, apricot sauce, sweet chili sauce, and marmalade, among others. It can be served with lime wedges, and lime zest can be used as an ingredient in the dish.

Crunchy coconut shrimp can be served as an appetizer or as a main course. It is a common menu item at seafood restaurants and is a popular dish at tiki bars in the Caribbean and the Florida Keys.

Coconut-milk based

Coconut shrimp is also prepared as a sautéed or stir-fried dish using coconut milk as an ingredient. This version of the dish may be served atop rice. Additional ingredients can include onion, garlic, tomatoes, parsley, and various spices.

Skewered
Coconut shrimp prepared using coconut milk can be prepared kebab-style on skewers and may include marinating the shrimp in the coconut milk and other ingredients prior to cooking. Additional foods, such as pineapple, may be placed on the skewers. This dish can be cooked by grilling or in a pan and may also be accompanied with various dipping sauces.

See also

 Ginataang hipon
 Pininyahang hipon
 List of deep fried foods
 List of shrimp dishes
 Fried shrimp

References

External links
 

Shrimp dishes
Foods containing coconut
Deep fried foods